Dear John C. is an album by American jazz drummer Elvin Jones featuring performances recorded in 1965 for the Impulse! label. The "John C." mentioned in the title is John Coltrane. The album was also released on SACD. It features Jones leading a quartet of alto saxophonist Charlie Mariano, pianist Roland Hanna and bassist Richard Davis.

Reception
The Allmusic review by Michael G. Nastos awarded the album 4 stars stating "The variety from cut to cut is engaging, and there's nothing over the top, even the drumming of Elvin Jones. With the musicality at a high level, Dear John C. needs revisiting by drumming students and jazz fans to note how teamwork, shared values, and held-in-check dynamics benefit the overall quality of music. It seems this recording is underrated when over time it should never be. Dear John C. is deserving of an excellent rating".

Track listing
Original track listing

 "Dear John C." (Hammer, Thiele) - 3:54
 "Smoke Rings" (Gifford, Washington) - 3:41
 "Love Bird" (Mingus) - 3:49
 "Feeling Good" (Anthony Newley, Leslie Bricusse) - 4:11
 "Anthropology" (Gillespie, Parker) - 4:20
 "This Love of Mine" (Sol Parker, Hank Sanicola, Sinatra) - 4:20
 "Fantazm" (Ellington) - 3:56
 "Ballade" (Hammer) - 5:18
 "Everything Happens to Me" (Tom Adair, Matt Dennis) - 5:56

Recorded on February 23, 1965 (tracks 2, 4, 5, 6 and 7), and February 25, 1965 (tracks 1, 3, 8, 9)

A CD reissue features a different track list and the bonus track "That Five-Four Bag"

Personnel
Elvin Jones – drums
Charlie Mariano – alto saxophone
Roland Hanna (1, 3, 8); Hank Jones (4, 5, 7) – piano
Richard Davis – bass

References

Impulse! Records albums
Elvin Jones albums
1965 albums
Albums recorded at Van Gelder Studio
Albums produced by Bob Thiele